Aguaruna may refer to:
 Aguaruna people, an ethnic group of Peru
 Aguaruna language, their language